CTSC may refer to:

Cathepsin C, a protein encoded by the CTSC gene
CKCS-TV, a Calgary television station branded as CTS Calgary